Alice Sapritch (29 July 1916 – 24 March 1990) was a French film actress. She appeared in 66 films between 1950 and 1989.

Partial filmography

 Le tampon du capiston (1950) - La pharmacienne
 Le crime du Bouif (1952)
 If Paris Were Told to Us (1958) - Une dame de la cour (uncredited)
 Premier mai (1958) - Une entraîneuse
 The Gambler (1958) - Marfa
 Les tripes au soleil (1959) - (uncredited)
 Testament of Orpheus (1960) - La Reine des Gitans / Gipsy Queen (uncredited)
 Les Scélérats (1960) - L'invitée qui complimente Thelma
 Shoot the Piano Player (1960) - Concierge (uncredited)
 Candide ou l'optimisme au XXe siècle (1960) - La soeur du baron (uncredited)
 The Menace (1961) - La cliente
 La fille aux yeux d'or (1961) - Mme Alberte (uncredited)
 Le Tracassin ou Les Plaisirs de la ville (1961) - La femme au parapluie (uncredited)
 The Two Orphans (1965) - La Frochard
 Who Are You, Polly Magoo? (1966) - The Queen Mother
 Lamiel (1967) - Mme Legrand
 La fille d'en face (1968)
 Le démoniaque (1968) - Mme Fernande Brussette
 L'île aux coquelicots (1970) - La comtesse
 Perched on a Tree (1971) - Lucienne Roubier
 Delusions of Grandeur (1971) - Dona Juana
 Les joyeux lurons (1972) - Léonie, la bonne du curé
 Elle court, elle court la banlieue (1973) - L'automobiliste hargneuse
 La raison du plus fou (1973) - La directrice de la maison de repos
 Le concierge (1973) - La comtesse de Beauchamp-Laville - la locataire du deuxième
 L'affaire Crazy Capo (1973) - Mme Rose
 A Slightly Pregnant Man (1973) - Ramona Martinez
 L'histoire très bonne et très joyeuse de Colinot trousse-chemise (1973) - Dame Blanche
 Les vacanciers (1974) - Tante Aimée
 Le plumard en folie (1974) - La vieille blonde
 Le führer en folie (1974) - Eva Braun
 Gross Paris (1974) - La grande comédienne
 Les Guichets du Louvre (1974) - La vieille dame / Old Lady
 L'intrépide (1975) - Minor rôle (uncredited)
 The Twelve Tasks of Asterix (1976) - (voice)
 Le trouble-fesses (1976) - Marlène
 L'arriviste (1976) - La mère de Marc
 Drôles de zèbres (1977) - Gilda Simfrid
 L'horoscope (1978) - La voyante
 The Bronte Sisters (1979) - La tante Elizabeth Brontë
 Un bon petit diable (1983) - Léontine MacMiche
 Adam et Ève (1984) - Fanchette, dite la Maldiva
 National Lampoon's European Vacation (1985) - Dowager on the Eiffel Tower

External links

1916 births
1990 deaths
French film actresses
20th-century French actresses
French television actresses
Actresses from Istanbul
Turkish emigrants to France